This is a list of towns and villages in the principal area of Rhondda Cynon Taf, Wales. Towns are highlighted in bold.

A
Abernant, Aberaman, Abercwmboi, Abercynon, Aberdare

B
Beddau, Blaenllechau, Blaencwm,  Blaenclydach, Blaenrhondda, Brynna

C
Church Village, Clydach Vale, Carnetown, Cwmaman, Cwmbach, Cwmdare, Cwmparc, Cwmpennar, Cefnpennar, Caegarw, Cefn Rhigos, Cwm-Hwnt

D
Dinas Rhondda

E
Efail Isaf

F
Ferndale, Fernhill

G
Glyncoch, Gelli, Groesfaen, Gilfach Goch, Glenboi, Glyntaff

H
Hirwaun

L
Llanharan, Llanharry, Llantrisant, Llantwit Fardre, Llwydcoed, Llwynypia, Llanwynno

M
Maerdy, Miskin, Mountain Ash

P
Penderyn, Penrhiwceiber, Perthcelyn, Penrhiwfer, Penrhys, Pentre, Penygraig, Pen-y-waun, Pontyclun, Pontygwaith, Pontypridd, Porth, Pontcynon

R

Rhigos

S
Stanleytown

T
Talbot Green, Trealaw, Trebanog, Trecynon, Trehafod, Treherbert, Treorchy, Tonypandy, Tynewydd, Tonyrefail, Tonteg, Ton Pentre, Tylorstown, Taffs Well, Treforest

U
Upper Boat

W
Williamstown
Wattstown

Y
Ynysybwl, Ynyshir, Ystrad

Sources
ŋ:Map of places in Rhondda Cynon Taf compiled from this list

See also
List of places in Wales

 
Rhondda Cynon Taf